The 2020–21 Iraqi Women's Football League was the second season of the Iraqi Women's Football League, and the first since the 2015–16 campaign. The season started on 31 December 2020 and ended on 12 April 2021. Naft Al-Shamal were crowned champions of the league by winning all six of their games.

Teams 
Four teams participated in the competition: Biladi, Naft Al-Shamal, Nineveh Girls and Shabab Al-Mustaqbal.

League table

Results

Awards
 Top scorer: Eto (Naft Al-Shamal)
 Best Player/MVP: Zahra Haidar (Nineveh Girls)
 Best Goalkeeper: Mariam Jawda (Shabab Al-Mustaqbal)

See also
 2020–21 Iraqi Premier League
 2020–21 Iraq FA Cup

References

External links
 Iraq Football Association

Iraqi Women's Football League seasons
Women's Football League